Tove Stang Dahl (born Tove Thiis Stang) (9 November 1938 – 11 February 1993) was a Norwegian legal scholar, criminologist, Professor of Law at the Faculty of Law, University of Oslo from 1988 until her death, and a pioneer of "feminist jurisprudence". 

She graduated with the cand.jur. degree in 1965 and was employed at the Faculty of Law directly upon graduation, first at the Department of Criminology and Criminal Law (1965–1977) and then at the Department of Public and International Law. She was one of the founders of the field of women's law as an academic discipline at the University of Oslo in 1975, and became head of department for the new Department of Women's Law (a sub-department of the Department of Public and International Law) in 1978. In 1978, she obtained the dr.juris degree. In 1988 she was appointed by the King-in-Council as Professor of Law.

She received an honorary doctorate at the University of Copenhagen in 1986 and several other accolades. She played a central role in the establishment of the organisation Legal counselling for women and the Centre for Women's Studies at the University of Oslo, and was a member of the city council of Oslo 1967–71.

She was the daughter of art historians Nic. Stang and Ragna Thiis Stang, and was married to historian Hans Fredrik Dahl from 1960 until her death.

Selected publications 
 Barnevern og samfunnsvern : om stat, vitenskap og profesjoner under barnevernets oppkomst i Norge. Pax, 1978.  (1992 )
 Child welfare and social defence. Universitetsforlaget, 1985 
 «Kvinner som ofre - særlig om hustruvold» I: Nordisk tidsskrift for kriminalvidenskab ; 1980:1-2
 Husmorrett : seminar i husmorrett arrangert av Norges husmorforbund i samarbeid med Avdeling for kvinnerett, 10. og 11. juni 1981. Av Tove Stang Dahl, Marianne Fastvold, Tone Sverdrup. Universitetsforlaget, 1981. 
 Kvinnerett I. Tove Stang Dahl (red.). Universitetsforlaget, 1985 
 Kvinnerett II. Tove Stang Dahl (red.). Universitetsforlaget, 1985  
 Women's law : an introduction to feminist jurisprudence. Universitetsforlaget, 1987  (1988 )
 El derecho de la mujer. Madrid : Vindication feminista, 1987 
 Frauenrecht : eine Einführung in feministisches Recht. Bielefeld : AJZ, 1992   
 O direito das mulheres. Gulbenkian: Lisboa 
 Den muslimske familie : en undersøkelse av kvinners rett i islam. Universitetsforlaget, 1992  (2003 )
 The Muslim family : a study of women's rights in Islam. Scandinavian University Press,  1997 
 Pene piker haiker ikke : artikler om kvinnerett, strafferett og velferdsstat. Universitetsforlaget, 1994

Literature
 Annelene Svingen. Tove Stang Dahl : en annotert bibliografi over bøker og artikler: Oslo : Institutt for offentlig rett, Universitetet i Oslo, 1994 - 33 s. - (Kvinnerettslige studier ; nr 34) (Institutt for offentlig retts skriftserie ; nr 4/1994).

References

Norwegian legal scholars
Norwegian criminologists
Norwegian women criminologists
Academic staff of the Faculty of Law, University of Oslo
1938 births
1993 deaths